Notable events in LGBT history in Norway include:

Kim Friele was the first gay Norwegian to publicly acknowledge and advocate for her sexuality, in June 1965.

The penal code's paragraph 213 was the order for the punishment (straffebud) of homosexual men. In June 1968 then minister of justice said that "it is not stated, if the paragraph should be lifted [or removed]". A different government came to power in 1969.

In 1970, a question was registered for interpellation in Parliament, by representative Arne Kielland. The Borten Government had no intent to answer the interpellation, but forwarded a law proposal about the age of sexual consent for gay males—18 years, while the age limit for all others was 16 years. A different government came to power in March 1971.

Homosexuality in Norway was decriminalised in 1972.

Same-sex civil unions were accepted by Norwegian law in 1993.

The law legalizing same-sex marriage in Norway took effect on January 1, 2009.

References

Norway
Social history of Norway
LGBT in Norway